The 2019–20 Stade Malherbe Caen season was the 107th season of the French football club since its creation in 1913. Following relegation from Ligue 1 in 2018-19, this was the club's first season back in Ligue 2 after five consecutive seasons in the top flight.

Players

Current squad

 
 (c)

Competitions

Ligue 2

League table

Matches

Coupe de France

Seventh round

Eighth round

Round of 64

Round of 32

Coupe de la Ligue

First round

References

Caen
2019